The men's 800 metres event at the 2009 European Athletics U23 Championships was held in Kaunas, Lithuania, at S. Dariaus ir S. Girėno stadionas (Darius and Girėnas Stadium) on 16 and 18 July.

Medalists

Results

Final
18 July

Heats
16 July
Qualified: first 2 each heat and 2 best to Final

Heat 1

Heat 2

Heat 3

Participation
According to an unofficial count, 23 athletes from 14 countries participated in the event.

 (1)
 (1)
 (1)
 (3)
 (3)
 (1)
 (1)
 (1)
 (1)
 (1)
 (3)
 (1)
 (3)
 (2)

References

800 metres
800 metres at the European Athletics U23 Championships